"Loca" (English: Crazy) is a song by Spanish-German singer-songwriter Álvaro Soler. It was released on 25 January 2019 as a non-album single. The song was written by Soler, Ali Zuckowski, Jakke Erixson, Rabitt and Simon Triebel.

Music video
The music video for "Loca" was released on Álvaro Soler's YouTube channel on 25 January 2019. It features Soler singing the song in Tokyo, Japan, a city in which he lived for seven years. As of 8 March 2019, the video has over 9 million views.

Charts

Weekly charts

Year-end charts

Certifications

References

2019 singles
2019 songs
Spanish-language songs
Álvaro Soler songs
Songs written by Simon Triebel
Songs written by Álvaro Soler
Songs written by Jakke Erixson